Genea is a genus of truffle-like fungi in the family Pyronemataceae. There are about 32 species in the genus that occur in North America and Europe. The genus was circumscribed by Italian mycologist Carlo Vittadini in 1831.

The genus name of Genea is in honour of Carlo Giuseppe Gené (1800 - 1847), who was an Italian scientist (Zoology) and Professor of Zoology at the
Turin Museum of Natural History.

Selected species
 Genea anthracina
 Genea balsleyi
 Genea cazaresii
 Genea eucalyptorum
 Genea harknessii
 Genea hispidula
 Genea klotzschii
 Genea kraspedostoma
 Genea papillosa
 Genea pseudoverrucosa
 Genea sphaerica
 Genea subbaetica
 Genea verrucosa

References

Pyronemataceae
Truffles (fungi)
Pezizales genera